ACUM may stand for:

ACUM Platforma DA și PAS, or NOW Platform DA and PAS, a political alliance in Moldova
Partidul ACUM, a political party in Romania
ACUM, Hebrew abbreviation for Society of Authors, Composers and Music Publishers in Israel
United Citizens Association of Macau